Rosenegg may refer to:

 Rosenegg (mountain),  a mountain of Baden-Württemberg, Germany
 Schloss Rosenegg, a schloss (castle) in Rosenegg, Fieberbrunn, Austria